Ždralovi  is a suburb of the city of Bjelovar, population 1,423 (census 2011).

References

Populated places in Bjelovar-Bilogora County